The 1966 World Rowing Championships was the second time that world championships in rowing were held. The regatta was held from 8 to 11 September at Lake Bled in Bled, Slovenia, Yugoslavia. There were 613 rowers from 32 countries who competed  in the seven Olympic boat classes. Marketing and advertising for the event were handled by Cesar Lüthi.

The Australian rowing history website has the following commentary: "The superbly organized regatta was held on the magnificent lake at Bled: a fitting setting for the second world championships." Prior to the 4th World Rowing Championships in 1974, only men competed.

Background
Bled and the German cities of Essen and Duisburg had competed for the right to host the second World Rowing Championships. At a FISA meeting in August 1963, held in conjunction with the 1963 European Rowing Championships for men, the decision in favour of Bled was made.

Medal summary

Medalists at the 1966 World Rowing Championships:

Men's events

Event codes

Medal table

Finals

References

Rowing competitions in Slovenia
World Rowing Championships
World Rowing Championships
1966 in Yugoslav sport
1966 in Slovenia
Rowing
Sport in Bled
Rowing